Let's Get Married is a 1937 American comedy film directed by Alfred E. Green and starring Ida Lupino, who plays the daughter of a political consultant, Joe Quinn (Walter Connolly). It was produced and distributed by Columbia Pictures. Lupino was loaned out from Paramount to make the film.

Cast 
 Ida Lupino as Paula Quinn
 Walter Connolly as Joe Quinn
 Ralph Bellamy as Kirk Duncan
 Raymond Walburn as B. B. Harrington
 Robert Allen as Charles
 Nana Bryant as Mrs. Willoughby
 Reginald Denny as George Willoughby
 Edward McWade as Tom
 Emmett Vogan as Dick
 Will Morgan as Harry
 Granville Bates as Hank Keith

References

Bibliography
 Bubbeo, Daniel. The Women of Warner Brothers: The Lives and Careers of 15 Leading Ladies, with Filmographies for Each. McFarland, 2001.
 Donati, William. Ida Lupino: A Biography. University Press of Kentucky, 2013.

External links 
 
 Turner Classic Movies page

1937 films
Columbia Pictures films
Films directed by Alfred E. Green
1937 comedy films
American comedy films
American black-and-white films
1930s American films
1930s English-language films